Christopher Allen Lloyd (born October 22, 1938) is an American actor. He has appeared in many theater productions, films, and on television since the 1960s. He is known for portraying Dr. Emmett "Doc" Brown in the Back to the Future trilogy (1985–1990) and Jim Ignatowski in the comedy series Taxi (1978–1983), for which he won two Emmy Awards.

Lloyd came to public attention in Northeastern theater productions during the 1960s and early 1970s, earning Drama Desk and Obie awards for his work. He made his cinematic debut in One Flew Over the Cuckoo's Nest (1975) and went on to star as Commander Kruge in Star Trek III: The Search for Spock (1984), Professor Plum in Clue (1985), Judge Doom in Who Framed Roger Rabbit (1988), Uncle Fester in The Addams Family (1991) and its sequel Addams Family Values (1993), Switchblade Sam in Dennis the Menace (1993), Mr. Goodman in Piranha 3D (2010), Bill Crowley in I Am Not a Serial Killer (2016)  and David Mansell in Nobody (2021).

He earned a third Emmy for his 1992 guest appearance as Alistair Dimple in Road to Avonlea (1992), and won an Independent Spirit Award for his performance in Twenty Bucks (1993). He has done extensive voice work, including Merlock in DuckTales the Movie: Treasure of the Lost Lamp (1990), Grigori Rasputin in Anastasia (1997), the Hacker in the PBS Kids series Cyberchase (2002–present), which earned him Daytime Emmy nominations, and the Woodsman in the Cartoon Network miniseries Over the Garden Wall (2014).

Early life 
Lloyd was born on October 22, 1938, in Stamford, Connecticut, the son of Ruth Lloyd (née Lapham; 1896–1984), a singer and sister of San Francisco mayor Roger Lapham, and her lawyer husband Samuel R. Lloyd Jr (1897-1959). He is the youngest of three boys and four girls, one of whom, Samuel Lloyd, was an actor in the 1950s and 1960s. Lloyd's maternal grandfather, Lewis Henry Lapham, was one of the founders of the Texaco oil company and Lloyd is also a descendant of Mayflower passengers, including John Howland. Lloyd was raised in Westport, Connecticut, where he attended Staples High School and was involved in founding the high school's theater company, the Staples Players.

Career 

Lloyd began his career apprenticing at summer theaters in Mount Kisco, New York, and Hyannis, Massachusetts. He took acting classes in New York City at age 19—some at the Neighborhood Playhouse School of the Theatre with Sanford Meisner—and he recalled making his New York theater debut in a 1961 production of Fernando Arrabal's play And They Put Handcuffs on the Flowers, saying, "I was a replacement and it was my first sort of job in New York." He made his Broadway debut in the short-lived Red, White and Maddox (1969), and went on to Off-Broadway roles in A Midsummer Night's Dream, Kaspar (February 1973), The Harlot and the Hunted, The Seagull (January 1974), Total Eclipse (February 1974), Macbeth, In the Boom Boom Room, Cracks, Professional Resident Company, What Every Woman Knows, The Father, King Lear, Power Failure and, in mid-1972, appeared in a Jean Cocteau double bill, Orphée and The Human Voice, at the Jean Cocteau Theater at 43 Bond Street.

Lloyd returned to Broadway for the musical Happy End. He performed in Andrzej Wajda's adaptation of Fyodor Dostoevsky's The Possessed at Yale Repertory Theater, and in Jay Broad's premiere of White Pelican at the P.A.F. Playhouse in Huntington Station, New York, on Long Island.

In 1977, he said of his training at the Neighborhood Playhouse under Meisner, "My work up to then had been very uneven. I would be good one night, dull the next. Meisner made me aware of how to be consistent in using the best that I have to offer. But I guess nobody can teach you the knack, or whatever it is, that helps you come to life on stage."

His first film role was psychiatric patient Max Taber in One Flew Over the Cuckoo's Nest (1975), alongside future co-star Danny DeVito. He is known for his work as "Reverend" Jim Ignatowski, the ex-hippie cabbie on the sitcom Taxi, for which he won two Primetime Emmy Awards for Outstanding Supporting Actor in a Comedy Series; and the eccentric inventor Emmett "Doc" Brown in the Back to the Future trilogy for which he was nominated for a Saturn Award. In 1985, he appeared in the pilot episode of Street Hawk. The following year, he played the reviled Professor B.O. Beanes on the television series Amazing Stories. Other roles include Klingon Commander Kruge in Star Trek III: The Search for Spock (1984) (on suggestion of fellow actor and friend Leonard Nimoy), Professor Plum in Clue (1985), Professor Dimple in an episode of Road to Avonlea (for which he won a Primetime Emmy Award for Outstanding Lead Actor in a Drama Series), the villain Judge Doom in Who Framed Roger Rabbit (1988), Merlock the Sorcerer in DuckTales the Movie (1990), Switchblade Sam in Dennis the Menace (1993), Zoltan in Radioland Murders (1994), and Uncle Fester in The Addams Family (1991) and Addams Family Values (1993).
Lloyd portrayed the star character in the adventure game Toonstruck, released in November 1996. In 1999, he was reunited onscreen with Michael J. Fox in an episode of Spin City entitled "Back to the Future IV — Judgment Day", in which Lloyd plays Owen Kingston, the former mentor of Fox's character, Mike Flaherty, who stopped by City Hall to see Kingston, only to proclaim himself God. That same year, Lloyd starred in the film remake of the 1960s series My Favorite Martian. He starred on the television series Deadly Games in the mid-1990s and was a regular on the sitcom Stacked in the mid-2000s. In 2003, he guest-starred in three of the 13 produced episodes of Tremors: The Series as the character Cletus Poffenburger. In November 2007, Lloyd was reunited onscreen with his former Taxi co-star Judd Hirsch in the season-four episode "Graphic" of the television series Numb3rs as Ross Moore. He then played the role of Ebenezer Scrooge in a 2008 production of A Christmas Carol at the Kodak Theatre with John Goodman and Jane Leeves. In 2009, he appeared in a comedic trailer for a faux horror film version of Willy Wonka and the Chocolate Factory entitled Gobstopper, in which he played Willy Wonka as a horror-film-style villain.

In mid-2010, he starred as Willy Loman in a Weston Playhouse production of Death of a Salesman. That September, he reprised his role as Dr. Emmett "Doc" Brown in Back to the Future: The Game, an episodic adventure game series developed by Telltale Games. That same month, the production company 3D Entertainment Films announced Lloyd would star as an eccentric professor who with his lab assistant explore the various dimensions in Time, the Fourth Dimension, an approximately 45-minute Imax 3D film that was planned for release in 2012.

On January 21, 2011, he appeared in "The Firefly" episode of the J. J. Abrams television series Fringe as Roscoe Joyce. That August, he reprised the role of Dr. Emmett Brown (from Back to the Future) as part of an advertising campaign for Garbarino, an Argentine appliance company, and also as part of Nike's "Back For the Future" campaign for the benefit of The Michael J. Fox Foundation. In 2012 and 2013, Lloyd reprised the role of Doc Brown in two episodes of the stopmotion series Robot Chicken. He was a guest star on the 100th episode of the USA Network sitcom Psych as Martin Khan in 2013.

In May 2013, Lloyd appeared as the narrator and the character Azdak in the Bertolt Brecht play The Caucasian Chalk Circle, produced by the Classic Stage Company in New York.

On the October 21, 2015, episode of Jimmy Kimmel Live, Lloyd and Michael J. Fox appeared in a Back to the Future skit to commemorate the date in the second installment of the film trilogy.

In May 2018, Lloyd made a cameo appearance in the episode titled "No Country For Old Women" of Roseanne, where he played the role of Lou, the boyfriend to the mother of Roseanne and Jackie. He is set to reprise the role in an episode of its spin-off, The Conners, airing May 4, 2022. In late 2019, he provided the voice of Xehanort in the "Re Mind" downloadable content of Kingdom Hearts III, taking over the role from the late Leonard Nimoy and Rutger Hauer, and reprised the role in the 2020 video game Kingdom Hearts: Melody of Memory.

In March 2021, Lloyd played the best friend of William Shatner in the romantic comedy movie Senior Moment, also starring Jean Smart.

In September 2021, Lloyd portrayed Rick Sanchez in a series of promotional interstitials directed by Paul B. Cummings for the two-part fifth season finale of Rick and Morty, a character inspired by Lloyd's portrayal of Dr. Emmett "Doc" Brown from Back to the Future, alongside Jaeden Martell as Morty Smith. Addressing his own and original voice actor Justin Roiland's portrayals of Sanchez compared to Doc Brown, Lloyd stated that "he felt like Doc and Rick were like two brothers that took different paths."

In March 2022, Lloyd appeared in a promotion for the time travel film The Adam Project along with two of its stars, Ryan Reynolds and Mark Ruffalo.

Upcoming projects 
By July 2020, Lloyd was cast as The Alchemist in Man & Witch, a family-friendly fantasy-adventure film directed by Rob Margolies, with Jim Henson's Creature Shop set to create the puppets for the film.

In March 2022, Lloyd was announced to be set to guest star in an episode of the third season of The Mandalorian, expected to be released later in the year by Disney+.

In April 2022, it was announced that Lloyd will star in Spirit Halloween: The Movie, a film produced in partnership with the Spirit Halloween retailer. He plays Alec Windsor, a wealthy land developer who disappeared one Halloween night, and whose spirit is said to haunt the town in which the film is set each year on Halloween. The film is slated to be released on video-on-demand (VOD) on October 11, 2022.

Personal life 
Lloyd married Catharine Dallas Dixon Boyd, on June 6, 1959. They divorced in 1971. He married actress Kay Tornborg in 1974, divorcing her circa 1987. Lloyd's third marriage, to Carol Ann Vanek, had lasted more than two years when they were in the process of divorce in July 1991. His fourth marriage, to screenwriter Jane Walker Wood, lasted from 1992 to 2005.
In 2016, he married Lisa Loiacono, who was Lloyd's real estate agent when he sold his house in Montecito, California, in 2012. His former house on that lot was destroyed in the Tea Fire of November 2008.

Lloyd's philanthropist mother, Ruth Lapham Lloyd, died in 1984 at age 88. Her other surviving children were Donald L. Mygatt, Antoinette L. Mygatt Lucas, Samuel Lloyd III, Ruth Lloyd Scott, Ax Lloyd, and Adele L. Kinney. Lloyd's nephew, Sam Lloyd (1963–2020), was known for playing lawyer Ted Buckland on Scrubs.

Performances

Film

Television

Theatre

Video games

Music videos

Theme park attractions

Awards

References

Further reading 
  Includes discussion of his early work Off-Broadway, including the production of Happy End at the Chelsea Theater Center, and on Broadway, Kaspar and Total Eclipse.

External links 

 
 
 
 
 
 

 

1938 births
Living people
20th-century American male actors
21st-century American male actors
American male film actors
American male television actors
American male video game actors
American male voice actors
American people of English descent
American people of Welsh descent
Audiobook narrators
Darrow School alumni
Independent Spirit Award for Best Supporting Male winners
Male actors from Stamford, Connecticut
Male Western (genre) film actors
Neighborhood Playhouse School of the Theatre alumni
Obie Award recipients
Outstanding Performance by a Lead Actor in a Drama Series Primetime Emmy Award winners
Outstanding Performance by a Supporting Actor in a Comedy Series Primetime Emmy Award winners
People from Montecito, California